Ian Slade Porter OAM (15 August 1950 – 13 August 1999) was General Manager of Campbelltown City Council from 1988 to 1999 and Deputy Town Clerk of Bankstown City Council from 1978 to 1988.

Biography
Ian Porter was born and raised in Port Macquarie, situated on the New South Wales Mid North Coast. After completing his higher school certificate in 1968 he moved to Sydney to pursue a career in Local Government. He studied and gained his Town Clerks certificate at the Meadowbank Technical College (now Meadowbank TAFE) and in 1976 Porter married Judy, having two sons Andrew and Nicholas.

Career

Bankstown City Council 
Porter started as a computer operator at Bankstown City Council in 1968 and quickly rose to the position of Deputy Town Clerk, at only 28 years of age.

Campbelltown City Council
Recognised as a great visionary with exemplary people skills, Porter was appointed Campbelltown Council Town Clerk in 1988. The title of his position changed to General Manager in 1992.

In his 12 years he helped Campbelltown grow into a cosmopolitan city - one of the fastest growing in NSW.

He focused Campbelltown Council, with a 700-strong staff and budget of $100 million, on customer services and improved efficiencies

Local Government administration was Ian's life's work.  His skill in local government administration was acknowledged widely outside Campbelltown. He was a respected contributor and leader of the Institute of Municipal Management, and he was awarded, but unfortunately was unable to physically accept, an OAM for his services to Local Government.

Following Ians death a scholarship was set up in his name at Western Sydney University by Campbelltown City Council. This scholarship perpetuates the memory of Porter and his immense contribution to the Campbelltown community.

Death
Porter was diagnosed with Acute Lymphoblastic Leukaemia (ALL) in July 1998. After several courses of Chemotherapy he was declared in remission but doctors warned that there were chances of the cancer reappearing. A bone marrow transplant provided a better chance of full remission.  3 months after the procedure it was deemed successful. Porter was recovering at home in July 1999 when he contracted a common virus and was sent back to hospital. Due to his suppressed immunity his body could not fight the virus and Porter died on Friday 13 August 1999, two days before his 49th birthday.

Gallery Naming
In 1999 one of the galleries of the Campbelltown Arts Centre was renamed the Ian Porter Gallery in commemoration of Ian.

Scholarship
Campbelltown City Council has dedicated a scholarship to the memory of Ian.

Porter was totally committed to his community and to the principle of access to education for all its citizens. In the education field Porter was a lecturer in local government administration, a long-standing member of the UWS Macarthur Council and Chairman of the UWS Macarthur Consultative Committee. This scholarship perpetuates the memory of Porter and his immense contribution to the Campbelltown community, which will be remembered well into the 21st Century.

External links
Parliament of New South Wales Hansard transcript
Australian Government Honour Roll
WSU Ian Porter Scholarship
National Library of Australia

1950 births
1999 deaths
People from New South Wales